Mie Gomak is a Batak thick spicy noodle soup dish served in a coconut milk and andaliman-based broth, specialty of Toba Batak region of  North Sumatra, Indonesia. Other that traditional Batak lands surrounding Lake Toba, this dish is also a specialty of the Sibolga and Tapanuli area. Unlike common Indonesian noodles, the type of noodle used in this dish is a thick one called mie lidi, quite similar to spaghetti pasta, thus mie gomak is often described as Batak style spaghetti. Mie gomak is quite similar to Mie Aceh from neighbouring province.

Etymology
In local Batak dialect, gomak means "grab" or "squeeze", which refer to the method of preparing the noodle; by grabbing, handling, and squeezing the noodle with bare hand.

Ingredients and preparation
The thick noodle is made from wheat and formed similar with spaghetti, which in dried form is stiff and solid. It is called mie lidi (stick noodles), because it is similar with lidi or sticks broom made from the midrib of the coconut palm frond. Boiled noodles are usually prepared separately, while the spicy soup is poured and heated prior of serving. Mie gomak usually topped with hard boiled egg. Mie gomak is commonly served in kuah or in spicy soup. However, a variant might cook the dish further and use less liquid, thus creating a mie gomak goreng or fried gomak noodle variant.

Ingredients includes boiled stick noodles, chayote, carrot, daun salam or Indonesian bay leaves, lemongrass, beaten egg, and coconut milk. The bumbu spice mixture includes red chili pepper, shallot, garlic, candlenut, turmeric, ginger, andaliman, leek, sugar, salt, and cooking oil. Crispy fried shallot and krupuk crackers might be sprinkled and added on top of the noodle, also added with sambal andaliman for additional zesty spiciness.

See also

 Mie Aceh
 Mie goreng
 Mie kocok

References

External links
 Mie Gomak recipe

Foods containing coconut
Batak cuisine
Indonesian noodle dishes